This is a list of video games of the Japanese media franchise Lupin the Third based on the manga written by Monkey Punch beginning in 1967.

Several Lupin III video games have been created. The first was a stealth game released to arcades in Japan by Taito in 1980 as Lupin III. A Laserdisc video game entitled Cliff Hanger was released to arcades in North America in 1983 by Stern. While it uses footage from The Mystery of Mamo and The Castle of Cagliostro to provide a gaming experience similar to Dragon's Lair, it changes the characters' names and has an original plot. Epoch Co. released a second game called Lupin III for the Epoch Super Cassette Vision in Japan in 1984. Also in 1984, Lupin III: Legacy of Pandora was released for the Family Computer. This game featured Clarisse from Castle of Cagliostro. Two games were released for the MSX platform, both based on anime movies: Lupin III: The Castle of Cagliostro in 1987, and Lupin III: Legend of the Gold of Babylon in 1988. Lupin the 3rd: Hunt for the Treasure of Legend! was released for the Super Famicom on December 27, 1994. Sega released two games developed by WOW Entertainment for the Sega Naomi arcade system: Lupin III The Shooting, a light gun game, in 2001, and Lupin III The Typing, a typing game, in 2002. Bandai released Lupin the 3rd: Treasure of the Sorcerer King in Japan for the PlayStation 2 on November 8, 2002. This stealth game was later released in North America on February 10, 2004. Lupin is Dead, Zenigata is in Love, a stealth game developed by Banpresto for the PlayStation 2, was released in Japan on February 22, 2007. In 2010, Lupin III: Shijō Saidai no Zunōsen was released for the Nintendo DS.

References

Lupin III video games
 
Lupin III

Lupin III
Lupin III